Overseas Malays refer to individuals with Malay race ancestry (inc. Javanese, Malays (ethnic group), Minangkabau, Buginese people) living outside Indonesia, Malaysia, Brunei, Singapore, South Thailand and neighbouring Malay home areas.

Statistics

Asia
 Yunnan of China
 Cambodia
Malays: 15,000
 Myanmar (Burma)
Burmese Malays: 26,000
 Philippines
Malays: 2,000,000
 Sri Lanka
Sri Lankan Malays are also known as Ja-minissu: 50,000
 Japan
Malays: 12,000

Africa
 South Africa
There are 253,000 Cape Malays living in South Africa. These are a population of multi-racial ancestry.

Oceania
 Australia
Australia's ethnic Malay population number around 10,000 people.
 New Zealand
Malays: 2,200

North America
 Canada
Malays: 16,920
 United States
There are over 95,000 Malays living in the United States.

Europe
 United Kingdom
The Malay population in the United Kingdom is 49,000.

See also
 Overseas Indonesian
 Overseas Minangkabau
 Cape Malays
 Cocos Malays
 Malays in Singapore

References

External links

 
Malay people
Indonesian diaspora